Blönduós is a town and former municipality in the north of Iceland with a population of 895 in 2018. 
Like many towns and villages around Iceland, Blönduós did not emerge as a village until the late 19th century. The town is situated on Route 1 at the mouth of the glacial river Blanda. Hrútey , a small island and natural reserve encircled by the river, is accessible via a pedestrian bridge just off the ring road. In 2022, the town merged with Húnavatnshreppur to form Húnabyggð.

Geography

One of Blönduós' main characteristics is that the town is split into two parts by the glacial river Blanda, for which it is named (Blöndu is an oblique case of Blanda). The old part of town (Icelandic: "gamli bærinn"), including many original houses from the late 19th and early 20th century, is located on the south side of the river. Many of the local companies, the elementary school, supermarket, community center and sports facilities including a modern outdoor heated pool are located on the north side. On a hill above town is a church with striking architecture that is intended to resemble a volcanic crater.

Economy
Most of the industry and livelihood in Blönduós evolve around service for agriculture and tourism. In recent years, the town has become known for its connection with textiles. A wool washery, Iceland's only textile museum  and the Icelandic Textile Center, featuring a residency program for international textile artists and scholars, are all located in Blönduós.

Notable people
María Ólafsdóttir (born 1993), singer, musician and actress

Twin towns – sister cities

Blönduós is twinned with:
 Horsens, Denmark
 Karlstad, Sweden
 Moss, Norway
 Nokia, Finland

Climate
Blönduós has a tundra climate (ET).

References

External links

Statistics Iceland
More information and photos about Blönduós town on Hit Iceland
Official website
"Textile Museum Homepage"
"Textile Center Homepage"

Former municipalities of Iceland
Populated places in Northwestern Region (Iceland)
States and territories disestablished in 2022